A disintegrin and metalloprotease 17 (ADAM17), also called TACE (tumor necrosis factor-α-converting enzyme), is a 70-kDa enzyme that belongs to the ADAM protein family of disintegrins and metalloproteases.

Chemical characteristics 

ADAM17 is an 824-amino acid polypeptide.

Function 

ADAM17 is understood to be involved in the processing of tumor necrosis factor alpha (TNF-α) at the surface of the cell, and from within the intracellular membranes of the trans-Golgi network. This process, which is also known as 'shedding', involves the cleavage and release of a soluble ectodomain from membrane-bound pro-proteins (such as pro-TNF-α), and is of known physiological importance. ADAM17 was the first 'sheddase' to be identified, and is also understood to play a role in the release of a diverse variety of membrane-anchored cytokines, cell adhesion molecules, receptors, ligands, and enzymes.

Cloning of the TNF-α gene revealed it to encode a 26 kDa type II transmembrane pro-polypeptide that becomes inserted into the cell membrane during its maturation. At the cell surface, pro-TNF-α is biologically active, and is able to induce immune responses via juxtacrine intercellular signaling. However, pro-TNF-α can undergo a proteolytic cleavage at its Ala76-Val77 amide bond, which releases a soluble 17kDa extracellular domain (ectodomain) from the pro-TNF-α molecule. This soluble ectodomain is the cytokine commonly known as TNF-α, which is of pivotal importance in paracrine signaling. This proteolytic liberation of soluble TNF-α is catalyzed by ADAM17.

Recently, ADAM17 was discovered as a crucial mediator of resistance to radiotherapy. Radiotherapy can induce a dose-dependent increase of furin-mediated cleavage of the ADAM17 proform to active ADAM17, which results in enhanced ADAM17 activity in vitro and in vivo. It was also shown that radiotherapy activates ADAM17 in non-small cell lung cancer, which results in shedding of multiple survival factors, growth factor pathway activation, and radiotherapy-induced treatment resistance.

ADAM17 may play a prominent role in the Notch signaling pathway, during the proteolytic release of the Notch intracellular domain (from the Notch1 receptor) that occurs following ligand binding.   ADAM17 also regulates the MAP kinase signaling pathway by regulating shedding of the EGFR ligand amphiregulin in the mammary gland. ADAM17 also has a role in the shedding of L-selectin, a cellular adhesion molecule.

Interactions 

ADAM17 has been shown to interact with:
 DLG1 
 MAD2L1, and
 MAPK1.

Activation 

The localization of ADAM17 is speculated to be an important determinant of shedding activity. TNF-α processing has classically been understood to occur in the trans-Golgi network, and be closely connected to transport of soluble TNF-α to the cell surface. Shedding is also associated with clustering of ADAM17 with its substrate, membrane bound TNF, in lipid rafts.  The overall process is called substrate presentation and regulated by cholesterol.  Research also suggests that the majority of mature, endogenous ADAM17 may be localized to a perinuclear compartment, with only a small amount of TACE being present on the cell surface. The localization of mature ADAM17 to a perinuclear compartment, therefore, raises the possibility that ADAM17-mediated ectodomain shedding may also occur in the intracellular environment, in contrast with the conventional model.

Functional ADAM17 has been documented to be ubiquitously expressed in the human colon, with increased activity in the colonic mucosa of patients with ulcerative colitis, a main form of inflammatory bowel disease. Other experiments have also suggested that expression of ADAM17 may be inhibited by ethanol.

Clinical significance 
Adam17 may facilitate entry of the SARS‑CoV‑2 virus, possibly by enabling fusion of virus particles with the cytoplasmic membrane. Adam17 has similar ACE2 cleavage activity as TMPRSS2, but by forming soluble ACE2, Adam17 may actually have the protective effect of blocking circulating SARS‑CoV‑2 virus particles. 

Adam17 sheddase activity may contribute to COVID-19 inflammation by cleavage of TNF-α and Interleukin-6 receptor.

Model organisms 

				
Model organisms have been used in the study of ADAM17 function. A conditional knockout mouse line, called Adam17tm1a(EUCOMM)Wtsi was generated as part of the International Knockout Mouse Consortium program – a high-throughput mutagenesis project to generate and distribute animal models of disease to interested scientists.

Male and female animals underwent a standardized phenotypic screen to determine the effects of deletion. Twenty eight tests were carried out on mutant mice and two significant abnormalities were observed. Few homozygous mutant embryos were identified during gestation. The remaining tests were carried out on heterozygous mutant adult mice; an increased bone mineral content was observed in these animals using Micro-CT.

References

Further reading

External links 
 
 
 

Proteases
Clusters of differentiation
EC 3.4.24
Signal transduction
Human proteins
Genes mutated in mice